Dudley Edmondson is an American writer and photographer specializing primarily in outdoors and nature writing and photography. He currently lives in Duluth, Minnesota. His books include What's That Flower? (DK Press, London, 2013), and The Black & Brown Faces in America's Wild Places (Adventure Publications, 2006), the latter focusing on African Americans in the outdoors, a subject on which he has spoken widely across the United States and for which a fellowship administered by the Greater Seattle YMCA was named for him.

Early life
Edmondson was born in Columbus, Ohio, to African American parents who relocated from the South during the Great Migration. He first got interested in birding as a high school senior when a teacher took him and other students on a birding trip, unusual for urban youth of color.

Career
In addition to his books, Edmondson's photographs are widely published in bird encyclopedias and natural history field guides worldwide, including dozens of images in Bird: The Definitive Visual Guide, by Audubon (DK Publishing.)

In 2022, Edmondson appeared in a new PBS series, “America Outdoors with Baratunde Thurston". The episode is titled "Minnesota: A Better World."

References

Further reading and listening
"Northern Voices: Dudley Edmondson Developing Environmental Justice For All". KAXE/KBXE Radio. May 2022.
Science Friday A Christmas Bird Count while Sheltering in Place Science Friday. NPR Jan. 2021
Northern Waters Photography and Film Exhibit  Minnesota Marine Art Museum Winona Minnesota Sept. 2021
This Land is Your Land. The Nature Conservancy July. 2020

External links 
 

Year of birth missing (living people)
Living people
American male writers
American photographers